John E. Chandler (July 13, 1915–October 15, 1982) was an American politician who served in the Kansas State Senate from 1977 to 1982.

Chandler was born in Topeka and raised in Junction City and Lawrence. He attended the University of Kansas, where he studied political science, and served in the U.S. Army during World War II, serving as a major with a tank battalion in the European theater. After the war, he worked in public relations for several oil companies before purchasing the Holton Recorder, a local newspaper, in 1950; he served as publisher there for the rest of his life.

Chandler was elected to the Kansas State Senate in 1976 and re-elected in 1980. He died of a heart attack while mowing his lawn in October 1982, in the midst of his second Senate term; Edward Francis Gordon was appointed to replace him.

References

1915 births
1982 deaths
Republican Party Kansas state senators
20th-century American politicians
Politicians from Topeka, Kansas
People from Holton, Kansas
20th-century American newspaper publishers (people)
United States Army personnel of World War II
United States Army officers
University of Kansas alumni